William "Will" Payne (born March 9, 1974, in Anniston, Alabama) is a producer, writer, and director for television and documentary film.  His creative credits include Ten Years of Tomb Raider: A GameTap Retrospective, an expansive look at one of the most successful franchises in videogame history, shot in a dozen cities across five countries.

Payne grew up in Heflin in Cleburne County, Alabama.

While attending Columbia University, Payne played American football and was a teammate of Marcellus Wiley, who went on to become a Pro Bowl defensive end in the NFL.

References

External links

1974 births
People from Anniston, Alabama
American directors
Living people
People from Heflin, Alabama
Columbia Lions football players
Television producers from Alabama